No. 62 Wing was a Royal Australian Air Force (RAAF) airfield construction wing of World War II. The wing played a significant role in supporting RAAF and United States Army Air Forces (USAAF) operations in the South West Pacific Area (SWPA).

History
No. 62 Wing was established in January 1943. Following the war, No. 62 Wing's headquarters was disbanded on 27 November 1945.

References
Notes

Bibliography
 

62
62
62